Louis de Bourbon, Comte de Soissons (May 1604 – 6 July 1641) was the son of Charles de Bourbon, Count of Soissons and Anne de Montafié. A second cousin of Louis XIII of France he was a prince du Sang, those considered part of the Royal family. Part of the faction who opposed Cardinal Richelieu and his policy of war with Spain, he was killed leading a revolt at the Battle of La Marfée in 1641.

Biography
Born in Paris, son of Charles, Count of Soissons and Anne de Montafié. Louis was made governor of the Dauphiné province (1612), an office inherited at the death of his father, and later governor of the Champagne province (1631). Around 1612, he was made the Grand Master of France, the head of the royal household.

In 1636, Louis conspired with his cousin Gaston d'Orléans and the count of Montrésor with the intention to murder Cardinal Richelieu and depose the King, but the plot failed.  The King's mother, Marie de' Medici, had tried as well on numerous occasions to remove the Cardinal as well as once trying to depose the King in favor of her younger son Gaston.  For this she was placed under house arrest for the remainder of her life.  

Taking refuge in Sedan with the Duke of Bouillon (prince of the independent principality of Sedan), Louis again conspired against Richelieu, and the Duke of Bouillon obtained the military support of Spain. 

Louis's army was engaged by a royal French army under Gaspard de Coligny, Marshal Châtillon at Sedan, but Coligny was routed at the Battle of La Marfée outside of Sedan on 6 July 1641. Of the King's 11,000 force, 600 were killed, 5500 were taken prisoner, while the Count of Soissons' forces suffered nominal losses.  This was due to the late slow arrival of the King's forces through muddy roads and the surprise cavalry attack from their flank from behind a hill. The Count of Soissons, however, was killed after the battle by one officer whose identity was never ascertained, possibly in the employ of Cardinal Richelieu. According to some sources, the Count died by accident while lifting the visor of his helmet with a loaded pistol, shooting himself in the head.

He was buried in the Soissons family tomb at the Chartreuse de Bourbon-lez-Gaillon in Gaillon, in the French province of Normandy. The county of Soissons was passed onto his only surviving sister Marie de Bourbon, Princess of Carignano and wife of Thomas Francis of Savoy, a famous general.

Issue
Louis Henri de Bourbon, bâtard de Soissons, Count of Noyers and of Dunois, Prince of Neuchâtel (August 1640 – 8 February 1703) illegitimate son of Louis and Élisabeth des Hayes. Line continues in the Dukes of Luynes family. Married Angelique Cunegonde de Montmorency-Luxembourg, daughter of François Henri de Montmorency.

Ancestors

References

Sources

Grand Masters of France
House of Bourbon-Condé
1604 births
1641 deaths
Counts of Soissons
Counts of Dreux
Louis XIII
Nobility from Paris
17th-century peers of France
Military personnel of the Franco-Spanish War (1635–1659)
French military personnel killed in action
Firearm accident victims
Deaths by firearm in France
Accidental deaths in France